Podhradie is a village and municipality in Prievidza District in the Trenčín Region of western Slovakia.

History
In historical records the village was first mentioned in 1352.

Geography
The municipality lies at an altitude of 550 metres and covers an area of 12.757 km2. It has a population of about 331 people.

References

External links
 
 
http://www.statistics.sk/mosmis/eng/run.html

Villages and municipalities in Prievidza District